Maximiliano Alexander Rodríguez Vejar (born 31 May 2000), usually named Maxi Rodríguez, is a Chilean professional footballer who plays as a forward for Chilean Primera División side Huachipato.

Career
As a child, Rodríguez was with Colo-Colo at under-14 level. Next, he moved to Huachipato and made his professional debut in the Primera División match against San Luis at the minute 93 on 28 September 2018. He scored his first two goals in the match against Ñublense on 17 April 2021.

References

External links
 
 Maximiliano Rodríguez at playmakerstats.com (English version of ceroacero.es)

2000 births
Living people
People from Talcahuano
Chilean footballers
Association football forwards
C.D. Huachipato footballers
Chilean Primera División players